Songo-salsa is a style of music that blends Spanish rapping and hip hop beats with salsa music and songo.  Well-known exponents include Bamboleo and Charanga Habanera.

References

Salsa music
Hip hop genres
Spanish hip hop